Andrés Amador (born 22 November 1924) is a Salvadoran former sports shooter. He competed at the 1968 Summer Olympics and the 1972 Summer Olympics.

References

External links

1924 births
Possibly living people
Salvadoran male sport shooters
Olympic shooters of El Salvador
Shooters at the 1968 Summer Olympics
Shooters at the 1972 Summer Olympics
People from Sonsonate Department